was a Japanese rock band. The band is signed onto Sony Music Japan's Ki/oon Records label. They came out with the song "Hikari e" in 2002. This song is known as the third opening theme of the anime series One Piece. Later in 2004, their seventh single, "SUNDAY", became the first ending theme of the anime series Yakitate!! Japan. On May 31, 2006, Yōsuke Ichikawa and Asami Tomaru left the band.

Past Member 
  — vocals, guitars
  — guitars
  —  keyboards
  — drums

Discography

Singles 

  (July 24, 2002)
 Hikari E
 happy days?
 Hikari E (Instrumental)

  (October 23, 2002)
 Nande
 Kumori no Chihare
 

  (March 5, 2003)
 Orange
 

  (April 9, 2003)
 

  (October 8, 2003)
 Sari Yuku Kimi E
 Rocket

  (August 25, 2004)
 Natsu no Chikara
 

 SUNDAY (November 10, 2004)
 SUNDAY (1st ending theme for Yakitate Japan)
 My Stride

 WORLD (March 1, 2006)
 World

Albums 

  (April 9, 2003)
 
 Sakura Sakukoro
 Hikari E
 
 Nande
 LITTLE STAR
 love
 Orange
 Young Young Young
 Kumori no Chihare
 

 laugh → love (December 1, 2004)
 SUNDAY
 aria
 
 Natsu no Chikara
 
 OVER (Bonus Track)
 
 
 
 
 
 Sari Yuku Kimi E
 

 LIFE (November 7, 2007)
 
 
 
 
 afternoon cafe
 
 spend my life
 SUN

External links 
 Official Web Site of The Babystars
 Official Web Site by SME

Japanese rock music groups
Ki/oon Music artists
Musical groups established in 1996
Musical groups disestablished in 2014
1996 establishments in Japan